The 2017 Akron Zips football team represented the University of Akron in the 2017 NCAA Division I FBS football season. They were led by sixth-year head coach Terry Bowden and played their home games at InfoCision Stadium–Summa Field in Akron, Ohio as members of the East Division of the Mid-American Conference. The Zips finished the season 7–7, 6–2 in MAC play to win the East Division. They lost to Toledo in the MAC Championship. They received an invitation to play in the Boca Raton Bowl where they lost to Florida Atlantic.

Notable Players: Ulysees GilbertIII, Kyron Brown, Jamal Davis, Kwadarrius Smith.

Previous season
The Zips finished the 2016 season 5–7, 3–5 in MAC play to finish in a tie for third place in the East Division.

Preseason 
In a preseason poll Aof league media, Akron was picked to finish fourth in the East Division.

Coaching staff

Source:

Schedule

Game summaries

at No. 6 Penn State

Arkansas–Pine Bluff

Iowa State

at Troy

at Bowling Green

Ball State

at Western Michigan

at Toledo

Buffalo

at Miami (OH)

Ohio

Kent State

2017 MAC Championship Game

2017 Boca Raton Bowl

References

Akron
Akron Zips football seasons
Akron Zips football